Mohammad Hoghooghi (May 3, 1937 – June 29, 2009) was an Iranian poet and critic.

Of the more than 30 books he has published, Modern Poetry, from Beginning until Today is considered one of the leading encyclopedic sources on modern Iranian poetry.

Hoghooghi suffered from cardiac and renal issues for several years prior to his death. His suffered from hepatitis which led to cirrhosis. He died on June 29, 2009 in Isfahan, his hometown.

Quote
 "Poets and writers want to write about the truths of their age from their own perspective, but their times don't allow it. But they do write something anyway. And this writing constitutes resistance. Because, in any age, the poet has been a protester of a kind,resisting the thought-molds of the day. However, this protest might be political, it might be social, or it might even be philosophical. At any rate, the artist is at odds with the prevalent conduct and thinking of his age; this has always been the case."

Works
 Angles and Orbits
 Winter Seasons
 The Orientals
 Inevitable Escapade
 With Night
 With Wound and Wolf
 A Cock with Thousand Wings
 Night
 Remain O Night and From Heart to the Delta

References

Iranian critics
Deaths from cirrhosis
2009 deaths
1936 births
20th-century Iranian poets
Iranian male poets
20th-century male writers
Writers from Isfahan
21st-century Iranian poets